Gordon Bradley (1933–2008) was an English-American football (soccer) player and coach.

Gordon Bradley may also refer to:

 Gordon R. Bradley (1921–2011), member of the Wisconsin State Assembly
 Gordon Bradley (footballer, born 1925) (1925–2006), English footballer